Gunnar Gran (11 July 1931 – 12 June 2016) was a Norwegian media executive.

He was born in Ålesund as a son of Wilhelm Ernst Ramm Gran (1890–1979) and Marit Mogstad (1896–1982). He was married twice, the second time to Kari Fougner, an older sister of Else Bugge Fougner. He finished his secondary education in Oslo in 1950 and started philology studies. He was hired in the Norwegian News Agency in 1952, Aftenposten in 1961 and the Norwegian Broadcasting Corporation in 1967. He was a subeditor in the radio newscast Dagsnytt, later promoted to editor. He was the director of radio from 1981 to 1986. Norway had only one radio channel until 1984, when NRK P2 was opened. As such a new director was hired for P2, while Gran continued as director of NRK P1 only.

Gran was then the chief executive officer of Aftenposten from 1986 to 1990, also chairing the employers' organization Avisenes Arbeidsgiverforening from 1987 to 1990. He was the secretary-general of the Norwegian Press Association from 1990 to 1996 (acting until 1992), then the secretary-general of the Norway-America Association from 1996 and the Norse Federation from 1999 to 2001.

He published the books Media in Norway (1999), the memoirs Men radioen var ikke død (2000) and Til Kjølen skilte oss. Unionsoppløsningen i svensk og norsk presse.

He resided in Blindern.

References

1931 births
2016 deaths
People from Ålesund
Norwegian journalists
NRK people
Norwegian media executives
Norwegian memoirists